General Thirachai Nakawanich PC (born 15 November 1955) is a Thai military officer who served as Commander-in-Chief of the Royal Thai Army from 2015 to 2016. He succeeded Udomdej Sitabutr, with whom he has had a long-running feud, and whose preferred successor would have been Preecha Chan-ocha, brother of Prime Minister and NCPO chief Prayuth Chan-ocha. He was succeeded in 2016 by General Chalermchai Sitthisart upon reaching retirement age. In December 2016 he was appointed to the Privy Council by King Vajiralongkorn, but was relieved of his duties in June 2018 for unspecified reasons.

References

Thirachai Nakwanich
Thirachai Nakwanich
Thirachai Nakwanich
Living people
1955 births
Thirachai Nakwanich
Thirachai Nakwanich
Thirachai Nakwanich